Count Nikolai Leopold Archibald von Bismarck-Schönhausen (born 29 December 1986) is a German-British photographer.

Early life and family 
Count Nikolai von Bismarck-Schönhausen was raised in Central London. He is a member of the House of Bismarck, a German noble family headed by his cousin, Carl, Prince of Bismarck. He is the eldest of four children. His father is Count Leopold von Bismarck-Schönhausen, the son of Otto Christian Archibald, Prince of Bismarck and Ann-Mari Tengbom, the daughter of Ivar Tengbom. His mother is Debonnaire Jane Patterson, the granddaughter of John Roseberry Monson, 10th Baron Monson and the niece of John Monson, 11th Baron Monson. He is a great-great grandson of German Chancellor Otto, Prince of Bismarck, Duke of Lauenburg.

Von Bismarck attended Harrow School, an all-boys boarding school in Harrow, London.

Career 
Von Bismarck works as a photographer. When he was sixteen years old he trained with photographer Mario Testino. Working under Testino led to his first professional photoshoot, titled "like a virgin" and was commissioned by Isabella Blow, at which time he was the youngest photographer to shoot for Condé Nast. He studied photography at Parsons Paris School of Art and Design in Paris, France.

After graduating from Parsons, he worked with Annie Leibovitz for two years. In 2013, he produced a photography exhibit focused on Ethiopia. He photographed Princess Beatrice of York for her official 18th birthday portrait. Most recently he has completed a book of portraits, 'The Dior Sessions' published by Rizzoli in 2019, with tailoring by Kim Jones, Artistic Director at Dior Homme.

Von Bismarck's portraits have appeared in numerous publications, including the Financial Times, The Telegraph, Vogue, and the covers of W magazine, GQ, and Harper's Bazaar. His reportage work has been featured in several publications including the Daily Mirror and The Times.

His relationship with model and businesswoman Kate Moss was much covered by the tabloids.

References

External links 
 

Living people
21st-century British photographers
Photographers from London
1986 births
Nikolai
Counts of Germany
English socialites
German socialites
Parsons School of Design alumni
People educated at Harrow School